Heleobops is a genus of very small aquatic snails, operculate gastropod mollusks in the family Cochliopidae.

Heleobops is one of three genera (together with Heleobia and Semisalsa) within the subfamily Semisalsinae.

Species
Species within the genus Heleobops include:
Heleobops carrikeri Davis & McKee, 1989
Heleobops docimus Thompson, 1968

References

External links

Cochliopidae